The men's +90 kilograms event at the 2006 Asian Games was held on December 9, 2006 at the Al-Dana Banquet Hall in Doha, Qatar.

Schedule
All times are Arabia Standard Time (UTC+03:00)

Results

Prejudging round 

 Mohammad Ullah of Afghanistan originally got the 10th place, but was disqualified.

Final round

References

Results – Prejudging Round
Results – Final Round

Bodybuilding at the 2006 Asian Games